Pristimantis pteridophilus is a species of frog in the family Strabomantidae.

It is endemic to Ecuador.
Its natural habitats are tropical moist montane forests and heavily degraded former forest.
It is threatened by habitat loss.

References

pteridophilus
Endemic fauna of Ecuador
Amphibians of Ecuador
Amphibians of the Andes
Amphibians described in 1997
Taxonomy articles created by Polbot